Elachista vartianae is a moth in the family Elachistidae. It was described by Parenti in 1981. It is found in Syria. Riliwanllahi Gbadamosi khalif

References

Moths described in 1981
vartianae
Moths of Asia